Port Fuad or Port Fouad is a city in Port Said Governorate, Egypt. Port Fuad is located in northeastern Egypt at the northwesternmost tip of the Sinai Peninsula on the Asian side of the Suez Canal, across from the city of Port Said. Port Fuad is considered a suburb of Port Said and together they form a metropolitan area of over one million residents. Along with the likes of Colón, Panama (North/South America) and Istanbul, Turkey (Asia/Europe), it is one of the few transcontinental cities in the world, in that spans it across two continents.

Port Fuad has a population of 81,591 (as of 2015).

History 
Port Fuad was established in 1926, principally to relieve overcrowding in Port Said, and was named after King Fuad I (also transliterated as Fouad), the first holder of the title King of Egypt in the modern era (having previously held the title Sultan of Egypt).

After the war of 1967 Port Fuad was the only piece of Sinai held by the Egyptians. The Israeli army tried to capture Port Fuad during the War of Attrition, but failed. After the October War, the Camp David Accord in 1978 Israel agreed to return Sinai to Egypt peacefully, and later the two countries signed a peace treaty. Today Port Fuad is a major Air Defence Position for Egypt. Despite its important location, as of 2006, Port Fuad was still considered a residential zone, with very few facilities and no major downtown or city center.

Geography 
The city is located on Port Fuad Island, a triangular island bounded by the Mediterranean to the North, the Suez Canal to the West, and the relatively new eastern channel from the Suez Canal to the Mediterranean to the East. Lying on the eastern side of the main canal, the island is considered part of Asia.

The Suez Canal Authority forms the main employment of the city, and its employees comprise most of the population. It has one general hospital.

Transport 

Until 2016 the town was accessible only by Ferry to Port Said. Three ferry lines: the "Port Fouad Ferry" and "Al-Raswa Ferry" from Port Said, and the "Tafreea Ferry" from Port Said East.

In 2016 the floating bridge to Port Said was opened.

Port Said East 

On the Sinai side of the canal, Port Said East is a recently launched development that contains the Suez Canal Container Terminal which opened in 2004. A side canal at Port Said East was opened in 2016.

In November 2015, President Al-Sisi publicly launched a new harbour development project at East Port Said.

In May 2018, an agreement was signed between Russia and Egypt for the development of a Russian Industrial Zone.

See also 
 Port Said
 Port Said Governorate

References

External links 

1926 establishments in Asia
1926 establishments in Egypt
Populated places established in 1926
Populated places in Port Said Governorate
Port Said
Suez Canal
East Port Said Industrial Zone
Populated coastal places in Egypt
Mediterranean port cities and towns in Egypt
Cities in Egypt
Free ports